Martin James "Marty" Schreiber (born April 8, 1939) is an American politician, publisher, author, and lobbyist who served as the 38th Lieutenant Governor of Wisconsin, and (following the resignation of Governor Patrick Lucey), the 39th Governor of Wisconsin from 1977 to 1979. Schreiber has become an advocate on issues related to Alzheimer's disease and dementia.

Early life and education
Schreiber was born in Milwaukee, Wisconsin. His father Martin E. Schreiber was a Republican member of the Wisconsin State Assembly (1941–1944), and later a member of the Milwaukee Common Council (1944 to 1976). The younger Schreiber attended the youth government and leadership program Badger Boys State in 1956 as a representative chosen from Milwaukee Lutheran High School. He attended Valparaiso University, and the University of Wisconsin–Milwaukee, majoring in urban studies. He later earned a J.D. degree from Marquette University Law School in 1964.

Political career
A Democrat, Schreiber served in the Wisconsin State Senate from 1963 to 1971. During his political career, Schreiber focused on education, children's issues, consumer protection, and the rights of workers and the elderly. Schreiber was the youngest senator in state history, having been elected at age 23.

In 1970, Schreiber was elected lieutenant governor on the Lucey-Schreiber ticket. He was elected the youngest chairperson for the National Lieutenant Governors Association in 1972.

Governor of Wisconsin 
In July 1977, following the resignation of Lucey to become the United States ambassador to Mexico, Schreiber succeeded him as Governor for the remainder of their four-year term. In the 1978 election, Schreiber faced a divisive primary challenge by developer David Carley.  In the general election, political newcomer Lee S. Dreyfus, a populist Republican and skilled orator, waged an unconventional campaign and successfully attacked the Lucey-Schreiber record on taxes and big government. Schreiber lost 54% to 44%.

Following the election, Schreiber moved to Stevens Point, Wisconsin and became vice-president of Sentry Insurance. He ran for the governor's office again in 1982, campaigning against Anthony S. Earl, former head of the Wisconsin Department of Natural Resources. He did not get past the Democratic primary election and returned to Sentry Insurance.

Schreiber ran again for office in 1988, seeking the Mayoralty of Milwaukee, but was defeated by John Norquist.

In 1988, after leaving state government, Schreiber formed his own public affairs consulting firm, becoming a successful lobbyist.

Personal life
In 1961 Schreiber married Elaine Thaney and they had four children. Schreiber also serves on the Milwaukee Public Library Board of Trustees. His wife, Elaine, was a former Milwaukee public-school teacher. Elaine died of Alzheimer's Disease on April 25, 2022.

Dementia and Alzheimer's advocacy 
Schreiber is the author of My Two Elaines: Learning, Coping, and Surviving as an Alzheimer's Caregiver, detailing his experiences in caring for his wife, who battled Alzheimer's Disease. Schreiber helped to found the "Elaine and Friends Caregiver Help Center" and is a frequent speaker on issues relating to Alzheimer's. His book was recognized by Caring.com as one of its "Best Caregiving Books of 2018."

Schreiber helped the Alzheimer's Association launch its "Operation: Stronger Together" awareness program. He also collaborated with Wisconsin's state government and business groups to help create the "Dementia-Friendly Employers" Toolkit, which has been used by human resources departments and employee assistance programs.

Works
My Two Elaines: Learning, Coping, and Surviving as an Alzheimer's Caregiver with Cathy Breitenbucher (Newark, Book Publishers Network, 2016 and Harper Horizon, 2022)

References

External links 
 
Governor Martin Schreiber, Wisconsin State Historical Society
Martin Schreiber & Associates, Inc. Public Affairs Consulting

|-

1939 births
Living people
Democratic Party governors of Wisconsin
Lieutenant Governors of Wisconsin
Democratic Party Wisconsin state senators
Politicians from Milwaukee
Marquette University alumni
University of Wisconsin–Milwaukee alumni
American Lutherans
Writers from Wisconsin
Valparaiso University alumni
20th-century American lawyers
21st-century American lawyers